Chhau-a-koe is a type of kuih with a sweet dough made with glutinous rice flour, sugar, and a ground cooked paste of Jersey cudweed or Chinese mugwort. The herbs give the dough and the finished kuih a unique flavor and brownish green color. The kuih is found in Fujian, Hakka, and Taiwanese cuisine.

Chhau-a-koe is usually made in Qingming Festival as a celebratory food item. Although the kuih can be made from either herb, Chinese mugwort is more commonly used in making Hakka-style caozaiguo. The herb-flavored dough is commonly filled with ground meat, dried white radish, or sweet bean pastes. In Taiwan, a filling consisting of Dried shrimp, shiitake mushrooms, dried and shredded white radish, and deep-fried shallots is commonly used.

See also
 Qingtuan, the Jiangnan form of this dish
 Kusamochi, the Japanese form of this dish
 Songpyeon, a similar Korean dish

References

External links
Related types of Taiwanese Kuih
Photo guide for making Caozaiguo
Photo guide for making the filling

Dumplings
Fujian cuisine
Taiwanese cuisine